Lorena Forteza (born 10 March 1976) is a Colombian model and actress.

Biography

Career
She was in The Cyclone directed by Leonardo Pieraccioni, and was in the TV movie Il mondo é meraviglioso in the role of Elena Martinez.

Illness
She is married to Damiano Spelta a former champion of offshore powerboat racing and after the birth of her son Ruben in 1995 she underwent postpartum depression and her weight increased. She subsequently became the spokesperson for a line of extra large women's clothing.

Filmography

Movies
The Cyclone (1996)
 Facciamo fiesta (1997)
 Colpo di stadio, (1998)

TV series
 Il mondo è meraviglioso, (2005)

References

External links 
 

1976 births
Living people
Actresses from Bogotá
20th-century Colombian actresses
Colombian female models
21st-century Colombian actresses
Colombian television actresses
Colombian film actresses